Novocaine is the commercial name for procaine, a local anesthetic.

Novocaine, frequently misspelled, may also refer to:

Songs
 "Novocaine" a song by Maggie Lindemann on the 2022 album Suckerpunch
 "Novacane" (song), a song by Frank Ocean and the 2011 mixtape Nostalgia, Ultra
 "Novacane", a song by Beck on the 1996 album Odelay
 "Novacaine" (song), a song by 10 Years on the 2017 album (How to Live) As Ghosts
 "Novocaine", a song by Alice Cooper on the 2003 album The Eyes of Alice Cooper
 "Give Me Novacaine", a song by Green Day on the 2004 album American Idiot
 "Novocaine", a song by Bon Jovi on the 2005 album Have a Nice Day
 "Novocaine" features on the bonus disc added to Switchblade Symphony's 1995 album Serpentine Gallery when it was re-released in 2005
 "Novocaine", a song by Lo-Pro from the 2010 album The Beautiful Sounds of Revenge
 "Novocaine", a song by Fall Out Boy on the 2015 album American Beauty/American Psycho
 "Heart of Novacaine", a song by Halestorm on the 2018 album Vicious
 "Novocaine", a 2019 single by The Unlikely Candidates
 "Novocaine", a song by Eels on the 1996 album Beautiful Freak

Other uses
 Novacaine (band), an American rock music group
 Novocaine (film), a 2001 film by David Atkins

See also